Risiocnemis is a genus of damselfly in the family Platycnemididae. It contains the following species:
 Risiocnemis seidenschwarzi

References 

Platycnemididae
Zygoptera genera
Taxonomy articles created by Polbot